Tanya Louise Bardsley ( Robinson; born 29 April 1981) is an English model and reality television personality. She is best known for starring in the ITVBe reality television series The Real Housewives of Cheshire which was first aired in 2015. She is married to footballer Phil Bardsley.

Early life 
Robinson was born in Wigan, Greater Manchester, and grew up in Richmond, North Yorkshire. Her father, Steve, worked for the British Army throughout Robinson's childhood.

Modelling career 
Robinson has appeared on the cover of Zoo Weekly, Ice, and several times in FHM magazine, as being the winner of their inaugural "High Street Honeys" competition in 2002, and being named to their "100 Sexiest Women in the World" list in 2003 (38), 2004 (32), 2005 (41), 2006 (29) and 2007 (63).

In 2003, Robinson appeared in a Lynx advert where she appeared as a pizza delivery girl in pink underwear. 

Robinson had breast enlargement surgery going from a B cup to a 32D. In 2007, she appeared topless for the first time since getting her breasts enlarged in Zoo, having previously only been photographed topless on holiday before her breast enlargement. Robinsons subsequently posed topless in shoots for FHM and Zoo, including a shoot for Zoo with fellow High Street Honey Kayleigh Pearson.

The Real Housewives of Cheshire 
In January 2015, the British reality TV series The Real Housewives of Cheshire debuted with Tanya Bardsley as one of the original cast members, along with Leanne Brown, Magali Gorré, Ampika Pickston, Lauren Simon and Dawn Ward. A British adaptation of the long-running American series The Real Housewives of Orange County, the series follows the lives of a selection of wealthy women in Cheshire. Bardsley left the show at the end of 2021 after almost seven years as a main cast member.

Bardsley appeared in the spin off The Real Housewives of Cheshire: Christmas Cruising special as a “friend of the housewives” which premiered in November 2022.

Wellness Hub 
In February 2020, Bardsley created the wellness hub at shop Tanya Bardo Boutique in Wilmslow, Cheshire with John Junior who is a British mental health activist from Wilmslow, Cheshire.

Personal life 

Bardsley is married to footballer Phil Bardsley. She has four children.

Bardsley has spoken about being diagnosed with dyslexia as an adult. In May 2021, Bardsley revealed that she had been diagnosed with ADHD after years of being treated for anxiety.

Bardsley, on 24 March 2022 closed her shop (Tanya Bardo Boutique) in Wilmslow, after it had been running for 5 years.

References

External links 
 
 Official website

1981 births
Living people
People from Wigan
Glamour models
English female models
Association footballers' wives and girlfriends
People from Richmond, North Yorkshire
The Real Housewives cast members